Takone is a rural locality in the local government area of Waratah-Wynyard in the North West region of Tasmania.
The 2016 census determined a population of 81 for the state suburb of Takone.

History
The locality name is believed to be an Aboriginal word meaning "sigh". It was gazetted in 1966.

Geography
The Inglis River flows through from south-east to north-east, and then forms part of the northern boundary. The Jessie River forms the north-western boundary as it flows toward its junction with the Inglis.

Road infrastructure
The C236 route (Takone Road) enters from the north-east and runs through to the south-west before exiting. Route C237 (Oldina Road) starts at an intersection with Route C236 and runs north before exiting.

References

Localities of Waratah–Wynyard Council
Towns in Tasmania